Natronovirga is a halophilic, thermophilic alkaliphilic, and anaerobic genus of bacteria from the family of Natranaerobiaceae with one known species (Natronovirga wadinatrunensis). Natronovirga wadinatrunensis has been isolated from sediments from the Lake Hamra in Egypt.

References 

Bacteria genera
Monotypic bacteria genera
Natranaerobiales
Taxa described in 2009
Bacteria described in 2009